Ahmadabad (also Romanized as Aḩmadābād-e Do; also known as Aḩmadābād) is a village in Rayen Rural District, Rayen District, Kerman County, Kerman Province, Iran. At the 2006 census, its population was 14, in 4 families.

References 

Populated places in Kerman County